The 2017–18 season was Juventus Football Club's 120th in existence and 11th consecutive season in the top flight of Italian football. Due to sponsorship reasons, from 1 July 2017 until 30 June 2023, the Juventus Stadium was known as the Allianz Stadium of Turin. During the previous season, president Agnelli announced that a new Juventus logo would be introduced, revealing a video showing the introduction of the new logo. The logo shows the word Juventus on top, with two capital Js shown together in different fonts with a small opening between them to almost make a bigger J. Agnelli said that the logo reflects "the Juventus way of living". In this season, Juventus introduced their new logo on the kits. On 16 February 2018, the first three episodes of a docu-series called First Team: Juventus, which followed the club throughout the season, by spending time with the players behind the scenes both on and off the field, was released on Netflix; the other three episodes were released on 6 July 2018.

On 9 May 2018, Juventus won their 13th Coppa Italia title, and fourth in a row, in a 4–0 win over Milan, extending the all-time record of successive Coppa Italia titles. Four days later on 13 May, following a 0–0 draw with Roma, Juventus secured their seventh consecutive Serie A title, extending the all-time record of successive triumphs in the competition. Then on 17 May, iconic Juventus goalkeeper Gianluigi Buffon announced his farewell to Serie A (and the national football team). He left Serie A after 23 career seasons, the last 17 being with Juventus, nine league titles, and 640 caps, the second highest in Serie A. Buffon would return to Juventus in 2019 after a one-year spell with PSG.

Players

Squad information
Players and squad numbers last updated on 4 January 2018.Note: Flags indicate national team as has been defined under FIFA eligibility rules. Players may hold more than one non-FIFA nationality.

Transfers

Summer 2017

In

Out

Other acquisitions

Other disposals

Total expenditure: €150,400,000

Total revenue: €127,650,000

Net income: €22,750,000

Winter 2017–18

In

Out

Other acquisitions

Other disposals

Total expenditure: €2,500,000

Total revenue: €23,500,000

Net income:  €21,000,000

Pre-season and friendlies

Competitions

Supercoppa Italiana

Serie A

League table

Results summary

Results by round

Matches

Coppa Italia

UEFA Champions League

Group stage

Knockout phase

Round of 16

Quarter-finals

Statistics

Appearances and goals

|-
! colspan=14 style=background:#DCDCDC; text-align:center| Goalkeepers

|-
! colspan=14 style=background:#DCDCDC; text-align:center| Defenders

|-
! colspan=14 style=background:#DCDCDC; text-align:center| Midfielders

|-
! colspan=14 style=background:#DCDCDC; text-align:center| Forwards

|-
! colspan=14 style=background:#DCDCDC; text-align:center| Players transferred out during the season

Goalscorers

Last updated: 19 May 2018

Disciplinary record

Last updated: 19 May 2018

References

Juventus F.C. seasons
Juventus
Juventus
Italian football championship-winning seasons